S. serrata may refer to:
 Saurauia serrata, a plant species endemic to Mexico
 Scylla serrata, the mud crab or mangrove crab, an economically important crab species found in the estuaries and mangroves of Africa, Australia and Asia
 Synodontis serrata, a catfish species

See also
 Serrata (disambiguation)